Michael Brennan (born January 24, 1986) is an American former professional ice hockey defenseman who most notably played in the American Hockey League (AHL).

Playing career
Brennan was a member of U.S. National Under-18 Team for two seasons (2002–04). He played four seasons (2004–08) at Boston College. In 2008 Breannan was named to the NCAA Championship All-Tournament Team.

On April 16, 2010 Brennan was signed as a free agent by the Chicago Blackhawks, and he spent two seasons (2008–10) in the AHL with Chicago's top farm team – the Rockford IceHogs.

He was invited to the Toronto Maple Leafs 2010–11 Training camp, and on September 26, 2010 he was assigned to the Maple Leafs AHL affiliate, the Toronto Marlies.
After recording a career high 10 points, Brennan was signed to an AHL contract with the Lake Erie Monsters for the 2011–12 season.

Prior to the commencement of the season with the Monsters, Brennan was invited to and participated in the Monsters NHL affiliate, Colorado Avalanche training camp. Upon his return to the Monsters, Brennan was a main fixture on the blueline appearing in a career high 74 games.

A free agent into the 2012–13 season, and now classified as a veteran, Brennan belatedly signed a contract with the Florida Everblades of the ECHL on November 5, 2012. After 9 games with the Everblades, Brennan made a return to the AHL, when he was loaned to the Worcester Sharks on November 27, 2009. He made his eventful debut for the Sharks on November 30, against the Portland Pirates. Brennan recorded 4 assists in 28 games before he was sideline by injury for the duration of the season.

On June 21, 2013, after 310 games in the AHL, Brennan signed his first European deal; a one-year contract with the German club Iserlohn Roosters of the Deutsche Eishockey Liga (DEL). In the 2013–14 season with the Roosters, Brennan was a mainstay on the Blueline in appearing in 51 games and producing 1 goal and 7 points.

After a second round exit in the post-season, Brennan was not retained by the Roosters and on September 30, 2014, Brennan accepted a try-out contract into the 2014–15 season, with Finnish club Sport in the Liiga.

Career statistics

Regular season and playoffs

International

Awards and honors

References

External links

1986 births
American men's ice hockey defensemen
Boston College Eagles men's ice hockey players
Florida Everblades players
Ice hockey players from New York (state)
Iserlohn Roosters players
Living people
Lake Erie Monsters players
Rockford IceHogs (AHL) players
Toronto Marlies players
USA Hockey National Team Development Program players
Vaasan Sport players
Worcester Sharks players